Thabalke is a small village in Nakodar.  Nakodar is a tehsil in the city Jalandhar of Indian state of Punjab. Thabalke was a Jagir ruled by Kang Jats.

STD code 
Thabalke's STD code is 01821 and post code is 144033.

References

Villages in Jalandhar district
Villages in Nakodar tehsil